Nick of the River is a British crime television series which first aired on ITV in 1959. A police procedural, it starred George Baker as Detective Inspector D.H.C. 'Nick' Nixon. The main cast also included Martin Wyldeck and Lane Meddick.

Other actors who appeared in the show include Vera Day, Ronald Fraser, David Lodge, Frederick Piper, Sidney Vivian, Michael Nightingale, George Woodbridge, Campbell Singer, Vanda Godsell and Philip Leaver.

A review in The Spectator suggested that the show and other recent ITV programmes Cannonball and Overseas Press Club - Exclusive! were "notable only for lack of interest and inspiration".

References

Bibliography
 The Spectator, Volume 203. F.C. Westley, 1959

External links
 

ITV television dramas
1959 British television series debuts
1959 British television series endings
1950s British crime television series
English-language television shows